The 1977 NHL Amateur Draft was the 15th NHL Entry Draft. It was held at the Mount Royal Hotel in Montreal, Quebec.  It was notable for the inclusion of players being drafted at 20 years of age.

This was the only draft in which the Cleveland Barons as a distinctive franchise drafted, as they would fold prior to the 1978 draft.

The last active player in the NHL from this draft class was Gordie Roberts, who played his last NHL game in the 1993–94 season.

Selections by round
Below are listed the selections in the 1977 NHL amateur draft.

Club teams are located in North America unless otherwise noted.

Round one

 The New York Rangers' first-round pick was re-acquired as the result of a trade on October 30, 1975 that sent Derek Sanderson to St. Louis in exchange for this pick.
St. Louis previously acquired this pick as the result of a trade on August 29, 1974 that sent Greg Polis to the Rangers in exchange for Larry Sacharuk and this pick.
 The Atlanta Flames' first-round pick went to the Montreal Canadiens as the result of a trade on May 15, 1973 that sent California's and Montreal's first-round picks both in 1973 and Atlanta's second-round pick in 1973 to Atlanta in exchange for a first-round pick in the 1973, second-round pick in 1978 and this pick.
 The Pittsburgh Penguins' first-round pick went to the Toronto Maple Leafs as the result of a trade on September 13, 1974 that sent Rick Kehoe to Pittsburgh in exchange for Blaine Stoughton and this pick.
 The Los Angeles Kings' first-round pick went to the New York Rangers as the result of a trade on February 14, 1974 that sent  Gene Carr to Los Angeles in exchange for this pick.

Round two

 The Detroit Red Wings' second-round pick went to the Chicago Black Hawks as the result of a trade on November 20, 1975 that sent the rights to Jean-Paul LeBlanc to Detroit in exchange for this pick.
 The Kansas City Scouts' second-round pick went to the Atlanta Flames as the result of a trade on October 13, 1975 that sent Buster Harvey to  Kansas City in exchange for Richard Lemieux and this pick.
 The Chicago Black Hawks' second-round pick went to the Toronto Maple Leafs as the result of a trade on September 28, 1976 that sent the rights to  Jim Harrison to Chicago in exchange for this pick.
 The Los Angeles Kings' second-round pick went to the Atlanta Flames as the result of a trade on December 2, 1976 that sent Larry Carriere and Hilliard Graves to Vancouver in exchange for John Gould and this pick.
Vancouver previously acquired this pick as the result of a trade on January 14, 1976 that sent Ab DeMarco Jr. to Los Angeles in exchange for this pick.

Round three

 The Cleveland Barons' third-round pick was re-acquired as the result of a trade on March 9, 1976 that sent Dave Hrechkosy to St. Louis in exchange for a fifth-round pick in 1976 and this pick.
St. Louis previously acquired this pick as the result of a trade on November 24, 1975 that sent Wayne Merrick to the California Golden Seals in exchange for Larry Patey and this pick. The Golden Seals relocated to become the Cleveland Barons for the 1976–77 NHL season.
 The Chicago Black Hawks' third-round pick went to the Cleveland Barons as the result of a trade on June 1, 1975 that sent Joey Johnston to California in exchange for Jim Pappin and this pick.
 The Minnesota North Stars' third-round pick went to the Montreal Canadiens as the result of a trade on July 9, 1975 that sent Glen Sather to  Minnesota in exchange for cash and this pick.
 The Atlanta Flames' third-round pick went to the Montreal Canadiens as the result of a trade on May 29, 1973 that sent Bob Murray and a fourth-round pick in 1977 to Atlanta in exchange for a fourth-round pick in 1977 and this pick.
 The Toronto Maple Leafs' third-round pick went to the  Colorado Rockies as the result of a trade on March 8, 1977 that sent Tracy Pratt to Toronto in exchange for this pick.
 The Los Angeles Kings' third-round pick went to the Montreal Canadiens as the result of a trade on June 12, 1976 that sent Glenn Goldup and a third-round pick in 1978 to Los Angeles in exchange for a first-round pick in 1978 and this pick.
 The Buffalo Sabres' third-round pick went to the New York Islanders as the result of a trade on February 19, 1975 that sent the rights to Gerry Desjardins to Buffalo in exchange for the rights to Garry Lariviere and this pick.

Round four

 The  Colorado Rockies' fourth-round pick went to the Vancouver Canucks as the result of a trade on September 12, 1976 that sent Vancouver's fifth-round pick in  1978 to Colorado in exchange for this pick.
 The Atlanta Flames' fourth-round pick went to the Montreal Canadiens as the result of a trade on May 29, 1973 that sent Bob Murray and a fourth-round pick in 1977 to Atlanta in exchange for a third-round pick in 1977 and this pick.
 The Los Angeles Kings' fourth-round pick went to the Philadelphia Flyers as the result of a trade on September 29, 1976 that sent  Dave Schultz to Los Angeles in exchange for a second-round pick in  1978 and this pick.
 The Montreal Canadiens' fourth-round pick went to the Atlanta Flames as the result of a trade on May 29, 1973 that sent a third and fourth-round pick both in 1977 to Montreal in exchange for Bob Murray and this pick.

Round five

 The Pittsburgh Penguins' fifth-round pick went to the Los Angeles Kings as the result of a trade on October 18, 1976 that sent Mike Corrigan to Pittsburgh in exchange for this pick.

Round six

Round seven

Round eight

 The Pittsburgh Penguins' eighth-round pick went to the Philadelphia Flyers as the result of a trade on March 8, 1976 that sent  Bobby Taylor and Ed Van Impe to Pittsburgh in exchange for Gary Inness and future considerations.  The future considerations became Pittsburgh's ninth-round, tenth-round, eleventh-round and twelfth-round picks in 1977 NHL Amateur Draft and this pick.
 The Buffalo Sabres' eighth-round pick went to the Philadelphia Flyers as the result of a trade on June 14, 1977 that sent cash to Buffalo in exchange for this pick.
 The New York Islanders' eighth-round pick went to the Montreal Canadiens as the result of a trade on June 14, 1977 that sent cash to the Islanders in exchange for this pick.

Round nine

 The Pittsburgh Penguins' ninth-round pick went to the Philadelphia Flyers as the result of a trade on March 8, 1976 that sent  Bobby Taylor and Ed Van Impe to Pittsburgh in exchange for Gary Inness and future considerations.  The future considerations became Pittsburgh's eighth-round, tenth-round, eleventh-round and twelfth-round picks in 1977 NHL Amateur Draft and this pick.
 The Buffalo Sabres' ninth-round pick went to the Philadelphia Flyers as the result of a trade on June 14, 1977 that sent cash to Buffalo in exchange for this pick.
 The New York Islanders' ninth-round pick went to the Montreal Canadiens as the result of a trade on June 14, 1977 that sent cash to the Islanders in exchange for this pick.

Round ten

 The Pittsburgh Penguins' tenth-round pick went to the Philadelphia Flyers as the result of a trade on March 8, 1976 that sent  Bobby Taylor and Ed Van Impe to Pittsburgh in exchange for Gary Inness and future considerations.  The future considerations became Pittsburgh's eighth-round, ninth-round, eleventh-round and twelfth-round picks in 1977 NHL Amateur Draft and this pick.
 The Buffalo Sabres' tenth-round pick went to the Philadelphia Flyers as the result of a trade on June 14, 1977 that sent cash to Buffalo in exchange for this pick.
 The New York Islanders' tenth-round pick went to the Montreal Canadiens as the result of a trade on June 14, 1977 that sent cash to the Islanders in exchange for this pick.

Round eleven

 The Pittsburgh Penguins' eleventh-round pick went to the Philadelphia Flyers as the result of a trade on March 8, 1976 that sent  Bobby Taylor and Ed Van Impe to Pittsburgh in exchange for Gary Inness and future considerations.  The future considerations became Pittsburgh's eighth-round, ninth-round, tenth-round and twelfth-round picks in 1977 NHL Amateur Draft and this pick.
 The Buffalo Sabres' eleventh-round pick went to the Philadelphia Flyers as the result of a trade on June 14, 1977 that sent cash to Buffalo in exchange for this pick.
 The New York Islanders' eleventh-round pick went to the Montreal Canadiens as the result of a trade on June 14, 1977 that sent cash to the Islanders in exchange for this pick.

Round twelve

 The Pittsburgh Penguins' twelfth-round pick went to the Philadelphia Flyers as the result of a trade on March 8, 1976 that sent  Bobby Taylor and Ed Van Impe to Pittsburgh in exchange for Gary Inness and future considerations.  The future considerations became Pittsburgh's eighth-round, ninth-round, tenth-round and eleventh-round picks in 1977 NHL Amateur Draft and this pick.
 The New York Islanders' twelfth-round pick went to the Montreal Canadiens as the result of a trade on June 14, 1977 that sent cash to the Islanders in exchange for this pick.

Round thirteen

 The New York Islanders' thirteenth-round pick went to the Montreal Canadiens as the result of a trade on June 14, 1977 that sent cash to the Islanders in exchange for this pick.

Round fourteen

 The New York Islanders' thirteenth-round pick went to the Montreal Canadiens as the result of a trade on June 14, 1977 that sent cash to the Islanders in exchange for this pick.

Round fifteen

 The New York Islanders' fifteenth-round pick went to the Montreal Canadiens as the result of a trade on June 14, 1977 that sent cash to the Islanders in exchange for this pick.

Round sixteen

Round seventeen

Draftees based on nationality

See also
 1977–78 NHL season
 1977 WHA Amateur Draft
 List of NHL players

Notes

References
 2005 NHL Official Guide & Record Book

External links
 HockeyDraftCentral.com
 1977 NHL Amateur Draft player stats at The Internet Hockey Database

Draft
National Hockey League Entry Draft